Pukeiti may refer to:

People
 Pukeiti Pukeiti (died 2012), Cook Islands politician

Places
 Pukeiti, Auckland, one of the volcanoes in the Auckland Volcanic Field, New Zealand
 Pukeiti (gardens), a garden of international significance in Taranaki, New Zealand